Michael Mee (born May 11, 1985) is a Canadian ice dancer. With former partner Mylène Lamoureux, he was the 2006 Canadian national junior silver medalist. They placed 15th at the 2006 World Junior Figure Skating Championships and 10th in their senior Grand Prix debut at the 2006 NHK Trophy. Their partnership ended following the 2009 Canadian Figure Skating Championships. Mee was born in Montreal, Quebec.

Competitive highlights
(with Lamoureux)

 N = Novice level; J = Junior level

External links
 Official site
 

1985 births
Anglophone Quebec people
Canadian male ice dancers
Living people
Figure skaters from Montreal
21st-century Canadian people